Nuup Bussii A/S is a bus company in Nuuk, the capital of Greenland, providing public transport services for the city. As of 2014 Nuup Bussii has 31 employees, operating 16 buses with a distinct yellow color, as well as five other small vehicles.

History 

Prior to the establishment of public services, the ground transport in the city was operated by private entrepreneurs. The volatility and alleged unreliability of the services prompted the former Nuuk Municipality to regulate the traffic, and establish a public transportation company, overseen by the municipal authorities. Nuup Bussii was then founded on 26 September 1980.
In 2012 the buses transported more than 2 million passengers around the city of Nuuk. Since 2009 Nuup Bussii provides city transport services in Nuuk for the new Sermersooq municipality, linking the town centre with the outlying districts and neighborhoods of Nuussuaq, Qinngorput, as well as Qernertunnguit in Quassussuup Tungaa.

Routes
 Route 1: Nuuk Center-Qinngorput–southern Nuuk–Nuuk Center, daily, every 40 minutes.
 Route 1A: Nuuk Center-Qinngorput–Nuuk Center, Monday–Saturday during peak hours only, every 20 minutes.
 Route 2: Nuuk Center–southern Nuuk–Qiterlia–Ilisimatusarfik–Nuussuaq–Qiterlia–Nuuk Center, daily, every 10 minutes (peak hours) to 40 minutes (after 21:00). 
 Route 3: Nuuk Center–Nuussuaq–Ilisimatusarfik–Nuuk Airport–Qinngorput–southern Nuuk–Nuuk Center, Monday–Friday only, every 30 minutes (peak hours) to 60 minutes (off-peak).
 Route 4: Nuuk Center–Queen Ingrid's Hospital–southern Nuuk–Qernertunnguit–Myggedalen–Nuuk Center, Monday–Saturday only during peak hours only, every 30 minutes.
 A skibus shuttles between Nuuk Airport and Nuussuaq during weekends that the skilifts are opened.

References

External links
 

Transport companies established in 1980
Transport in Nuuk
Road transport in Greenland
Bus companies of Denmark
Companies based in Nuuk
Transport companies of Greenland